ONE 156: Eersel vs. Sadiković was a Combat sport event produced by ONE Championship that took place on April 22, 2022, at the Singapore Indoor Stadium in Kallang, Singapore.

Background
The event will be headlined by a ONE Lightweight Kickboxing World Championship bout between the reigning champion Regian Eersel and title challenger Arian Sadiković.

The co-main event between Jackie Buntan and Smilla Sundell will challenge for the inaugural ONE Women's Strawweight Muay Thai World Championship.

A strawweight MMA clash between #1-ranked Bokang Masunyane and #2-ranked Jarred Brooks has been added to the event.

Former WBC and WMC Muay Thai World Champion Liam Harrison will face "Elbow Zombie" Muangthai PK.Saenchai in a bantamweight Muay Thai showdown. and Opening the lead card will be a strawweight mixed martial arts bout between Namiki Kawahara and Danial Williams.

Marcus Almeida returns to action against Oumar Kane. However, Kane withdrew due to Injury.

A Strawweight bout between former ONE Strawweight Champion Yosuke Saruta and Gustavo Balart was expected to take place at ONE: Bad Blood in February, but Saruta withdraw from the bout due to tested positive for COVID-19. The pairing was rebooked for this event.

A kickboxing light heavyweight bout between former SUPERKOMBAT Super Cruiserweight Champion Andrei Stoica and Giannis Stoforidis was scheduled for the event.   

A Women's Atomweight Muay Thai bout between Former Glory Women's Super Bantamweight Championship Anissa Meksen and Estonian phenom Marie Ruumet was scheduled for the event.

A Women's Strawweight bout between former Women's Strawweight title Challenger Ayaka Miura and Dayane Cardoso was scheduled for the event.

Mikey Musumeci is to compete against Japanese MMA veteran Masakazu Imanari this particular bout will be a Submission Grappling match.

Results

Bonus awards
The following fighters were awarded bonuses:

 $50,000 Performance of the Night: Mikey Musumeci, Smilla Sundell and Regian Eersel
 $100,000 Performance of the Night: Liam Harrison

See also 

 2022 in ONE Championship
 List of ONE Championship events
 List of current ONE fighters

References 

Events in Singapore
ONE Championship events
2022 in mixed martial arts
Mixed martial arts in Singapore
Sports competitions in Singapore
April 2022 sports events in Singapore